The 129th Infantry Regiment is a United States military unit of the Illinois National Guard. The 129th served in World War I and World War II.

Initially part of the 33rd Infantry Division during World War I, the 129th Infantry Regiment was detached on 31 July 1943, sent as the Espiritu Santo garrison force and later attached to the 37th Infantry Division on Bougainville during the Bougainville campaign on 13 November.

The 129th Infantry Regiment participated during the Philippines campaign and was detached and attached to the 33rd Infantry Division between 26 March and 10 April 1945, before rejoining the 37th Infantry Division.

The regiment is now known as the 129th Regiment (Regional Training Institute), providing training.

129th Infantry Drive in Joliet, Illinois is named in honor of the regiment.

Further reading
 Payan, Jack Louis. World War 1, 1918 : Kankakee (Illinois) Doughboys, Company L, 129th Infantry, 33rd (Prairie) Division. [Palos Heights, Ill.] : J.L. Payan, 2008. .
 Thornton, Earle C. Record of events and roster of the 129th U.S. Infantry (formerly 3rd Ill. N.G.) 65th Brigade, 33rd Division : in the war with Germany, July 28, 1917 – June 6, 1919. Camp Merritt, N.J.? : s.n., 1919. .
 United States. The 129th Infantry in World War II. Washington: Infantry Journal Press, 1947. .

Sources
Global Security - 129th Regiment Regional Training Institute
33rdinfantrydivision.org - Units
HyperWar - 37th Division

Illinois National Guard units
Infantry regiments of the United States Army National Guard
Military units and formations in Illinois
129